Helgaud or Helgaldus (d. c. 1048), French historian and biographer, was a monk of the Benedictine Abbey of Fleury.

Little else is known about him save that he was chaplain to the French king, Robert II the Pious, whose life (Vita) he wrote. Although earlier editors of this work of semi-hagiography expressed the opinion that "its value is not great either from the literary or from the historical point of view," it is now recognized as quite valuable, not only for the light it directly sheds on its subject, but also as representing an important phase in the development of medieval history writing.

The only existing manuscript of the Epitoma is found in Rome, Vatican, BAV Reg. lat. 566.

Earlier editions were reprinted by J. P. Migne in his Patrologia Latina, CXLI (Paris, 1844); and by M. Bouquet in the Recueil des historiens des Gaules, X (Paris, 1760), but the definitive edition (which includes a lengthy introduction and notes) appeared in 1965 by Robert-Henri Bautier and Gilette Labory (listed below).

Notes

References
 which in turn cites:
 Histoire littéraire de la France, VII (Paris, 1865–1869).
 Auguste Molinier, Les Sources de l'histoire de France, II (Paris, 1902).

Further reading
[Robert-Henri Bautier and Gillette Labory], Helgaud de Fleury. Epitoma vitae Regis Rotberti Pii. Vie de Robert le Pieux. Text édite, traduit et annoté par Robert-Henri Bautier (Sources d’histoire médivale, 1). Paris: CNRS, 1965.

Claude Carozzi, “La vie du roi Robert par Helgaud de Fleury: historiographie et hagiographie,” in Actes des congrès de la Société des historiens médiévistes de l'enseignement supérieur public. 8e congrès, Tours, 1977, pp. 219–235.  http://www.persee.fr/web/revues/home/prescript/article/shmes_1261-9078_1980_act_8_1_1301

Margot E. Fassler, “Helgaud of Fleury and the Liturgical Arts: The Magnification of Robert the Pious,” in C. Stephen Jaeger, ed., 
Magnificence and the Sublime in Medieval Aesthetics: Art, Architecture, Literature, Music (New York: Palgrave, 2010), pp. 102–127.

Sarah Hamilton, “A New Model for Royal Penance? Helgaud of Fleury’s Life of Robert the Pious,” Early Medieval Europe, VI, pp. 189–200. http://onlinelibrary.wiley.com/doi/10.1111/1468-0254.00011/pdf

Alexandre Vidier, L’historiographie à Saint-Benoit sur Loire et les miracles de Saint-Benoit. Ouvrage posthume revu et annoté par les soins des moines de l’abbaye de Saint-Benoit de Fleury, Saint-Benoît-sur-Loire. Paris: A. et J. Picard, 1965

Year of birth missing
1040s deaths
11th-century French historians
French Benedictines
French male writers